The canton of Villersexel is an administrative division of the Haute-Saône department, northeastern France. Its borders were modified at the French canton reorganisation which came into effect in March 2015. Its seat is in Villersexel.

It consists of the following communes:
 
Aillevans
Athesans-Étroitefontaine
Autrey-le-Vay
Autrey-lès-Cerre
Beveuge
Borey
Calmoutier
Cerre-lès-Noroy
Colombe-lès-Vesoul
Colombotte
Courchaton
Crevans-et-la-Chapelle-lès-Granges
Dampvalley-lès-Colombe
La Demie
Esprels
Fallon
Georfans
Gouhenans
Grammont
Granges-la-Ville
Granges-le-Bourg
Liévans
Longevelle
Les Magny
Marast
Mélecey
Mignavillers
Moimay
Montjustin-et-Velotte
Neurey-lès-la-Demie
Noroy-le-Bourg
Oppenans
Oricourt
Pont-sur-l'Ognon
Saint-Ferjeux
Saint-Sulpice
Secenans
Senargent-Mignafans
Vallerois-le-Bois
Vallerois-Lorioz
Vellechevreux-et-Courbenans
La Vergenne
Villafans
Villargent
Villers-la-Ville
Villers-le-Sec
Villersexel

References

Cantons of Haute-Saône